Adilson Cipriano da Cruz (born 16 December 1993) is an Angolan footballer who goes by the nickname Neblú and  plays as a goalkeeper for 1º de Agosto.

References 

 

1993 births
Living people
Association football goalkeepers
Angolan footballers
Angola international footballers
2013 Africa Cup of Nations players
Atlético Sport Aviação players
C.D. Primeiro de Agosto players
G.D. Interclube players
Girabola players
Footballers from Luanda
Angola A' international footballers
2022 African Nations Championship players